Shawn Gerald Swayda (born September 4, 1974) is a former American football defensive end who played four seasons with the Atlanta Falcons of the National Football League (NFL). He was drafted by the Chicago Bears in the sixth round of the 1997 NFL Draft but cut before the start of the season. He played college football at Arizona State University and attended Brophy College Preparatory in Phoenix, Arizona.

References

External links
ESPN profile
Sun Devils bio
Football Outsiders profile
The Pro Football Archives

Living people
1974 births
Players of American football from Phoenix, Arizona
American football defensive ends
Arizona State Sun Devils football players
Chicago Bears players
Atlanta Falcons players